XHAZN-FM is a radio station on 92.1 FM in Apatzingán, Michoacán, owned by Medios Radiofónicos de Michoacán. It is known as La Pura Ley with a grupera format.

History
XHAZN received its concession on June 25, 1991, broadcasting as the first FM station in Apatzingán. It was owned by Mario Ignacio Meléndez y Soto and sold to its current concessionaire in 1999.

References

Radio stations in Michoacán